Acacia spondylophylla, commonly known as curry wattle or spine-leaf wattle, is a small, flat topped shrub native to central and western Australia. The leaves, which are arranged on spaced whorls around the stem, have a distinctive curry-like smell.

Description
Like most species of Acacia it has phyllodes rather than true leaves. The phyllodes are arranged in whorls of 8 to 14 and are more or less flattened and straight or recurved towards apex. It usually blooms between May and August producing yellow flowers. The spherical flower-heads contain 25 to 40 yellow coloured flowers. After flowering sticky and leathery seed pods form.

Distribution
It is found in arid parts of central Australia in Western Australia, the Northern Territory and Queensland. In Western Australia it is found in the Pilbara and northern Goldfields regions where it is usually found along creeks and on rocky hills and gullies growing in stony or sandy soils often around ironstone. It has a disjunct distribution form the Hamersley Range in the Pilabara where it is quite common extending east and becoming scattered from east of the Rawlinson Range in Western Australia. It is then found in the Macdonnell Ranges and Musgrave Ranges in the Northern Territory and then further east to around Dajarra in Queensland.

Taxonomy
The species was first formally described by the botanist Ferdinand von Mueller in 1874 as part of the work Fragmenta Phytographiae Australiae.
It is commonly mistaken for Acacia perryi which has larger stipules and phyllodes.

Cultivation
The species is naturally found growing in stony and sandy soils, and has been brought into cultivation for arid area gardening. The shrub is drought tolerant and regenerates easily from seed.

See also
List of Acacia species

References

Flora of the Northern Territory
Acacias of Western Australia
spondylophylla
Fabales of Australia
Taxa named by Ferdinand von Mueller
Plants described in 1874
Flora of Queensland